Identity is a 2003 American neo-noir psychological mystery slasher crime thriller film directed by James Mangold, written by Michael Cooney, and starring John Cusack, Ray Liotta and Amanda Peet with Alfred Molina, Clea DuVall and Rebecca De Mornay.

Loosely based on Agatha Christie's 1939 whodunit And Then There Were None, the film follows ten strangers in an isolated hotel, who are temporarily cut off from the rest of the world, and are mysteriously killed off one by one. Several events which take place in the hours before the characters' arrival are introduced at key moments in the film using reverse chronology structure, and in a parallel story, a murderer awaits a verdict at a crucial trial that will determine whether he will be executed for his crimes.

The film grossed $90 million. It received polarized reviews from critics at the time of release, but has since slowly garnered a cult following.

Plot
A convict named Malcolm Rivers awaits execution for a vicious mass murder that took place at an apartment building. Journals belonging to Malcolm are discovered misfiled in the case evidence, not introduced during the trial. Malcolm's psychiatrist, Dr. Malick, and his defense attorney argue to use the evidence to prove Malcolm's insanity.

Meanwhile, ten strangers find themselves stranded in a torrential rainstorm at a remote Nevada motel, run by Larry Washington. The group consists of an ex-cop, now limousine driver, Ed Dakota; Caroline Suzanne, a washed-up, irritable actress; Officer Rhodes, who is transporting convicted murderer Robert Maine; Paris Nevada, a sex worker; newlyweds Lou and Ginny Isiana; and the York family, George, Alice (who was severely injured when Ed accidentally hit her with his limo), and their nine-year-old son, Timmy.

Suzanne is killed by an unknown assailant. Ed discovers Suzanne's head in a dryer, along with the number 10 motel key. Maine is suspected to be the killer as he has escaped. Lou and Ginny get into a fight and Lou is murdered next.

At the hearing, Malcolm's diaries indicate that Malcolm suffers from extreme dissociative identity disorder, harboring eleven distinct personalities. His defense attorney argues that he is unaware of his crimes, which is in violation of existing Supreme Court rulings on capital punishment. Dr. Malick is introducing the concept of integrating the personalities of someone with dissociative identity disorder as Malcolm is brought in.

While taking photos of Lou's crime scene, Ed finds the number 9 key in Lou's hands. He begins to suspect that the killer is counting down and targeting them in order. Maine fails to escape the motel area, and is subdued by Rhodes and Ed. Maine is killed next. Rhodes and Ed find the number 8 key next to his body, and harass Larry, who takes Paris hostage. Paris wrestles him off, causing Larry to attempt to escape in his truck, but he accidentally crushes George against a dumpster as he tries to save Timmy from being run over.

Rhodes ties Larry to a chair, and orders the other guests to stay until dawn. Larry convinces Paris and Ed that he is not the perpetrator by telling them how he ended up at the motel. Alice, still in bed, is checked on and presumably has died from her injuries, but Rhodes finds the number 6 key. George's body is recovered and the number 7 key is found in his pocket, which confuses the others.

Ed tells Ginny and Timmy to flee in a car but it explodes. The last four survivors discover that the bodies of all the previous victims have disappeared. Paris has a mental breakdown, revealing her birthday on May 10; it transpires that all eleven people were born on May 10 — which is also Malcolm's birthday, and the day he committed the murders.

Ed checks their ID cards in the office, discovering that each one of them is named after a state, and that their birthdays all match. With Dr. Malick calling out to him, Ed finds he is at the hearing, but is confused as to why he is there. Dr. Malick explains that he is one of the personalities that Malcolm Rivers created as a child. Learning one of the personalities committed the murders, Ed is instructed to "go back" to the motel to try to eliminate them.

As Ed returns to the motel, Paris finds convict-transportation files for both Maine and Rhodes in the police car, revealing Rhodes is a criminal acting as an officer. Rhodes attacks Paris, but she is saved by Larry, who is shot to death by Rhodes. Finally believing Rhodes to be the murderous personality, Ed goes after him and the two men end up shooting each other fatally, leaving only Paris still alive.

With the homicidal personality removed, Malcolm's execution is stayed and he is ordered to be placed in a mental institution under Dr. Malick's care. In Malcolm's mind, Paris settles down in her hometown of Frostproof, Florida. As she tends to her orange grove, she discovers the number 1 key buried in the dirt, and finds Timmy behind her. It is revealed Timmy orchestrated all of the deaths at the motel, including faking his death. Timmy kills Paris, while Malcolm strangles Malick, causing the van that is en route to the mental institution to swerve off the road and stop before Timmy's voice repeats the poem "Antigonish" by William Hughes Mearns one more time.

Cast
 John Cusack as Edward "Ed" Dakota, a limousine driver and a former Los Angeles police officer
 Ray Liotta as Samuel Rhodes, a correctional officer transporting convicted murderer Maine
 Amanda Peet as Paris Nevada, a sex worker leaving Las Vegas to buy a citrus grove in Florida
 John Hawkes as Larry Washington, the motel manager
 Clea DuVall as Virginia "Ginny" Isiana, a superstitious newlywed
 William Lee Scott as Lou Isiana, Ginny's husband
 Rebecca De Mornay as Caroline Suzanne, an '80s Hollywood TV actress chauffeured by Ed
 Leila Kenzle as Alice York, a wife and mother who is injured in a car collision
 John C. McGinley as George York, Alice's husband and Timmy's stepfather
 Bret Loehr as Timothy "Timmy" York, Alice's son and George's stepson
 Jake Busey as Robert Maine, a convicted murderer being transported by Rhodes
 Pruitt Taylor Vince as Malcolm Rivers, a convicted mass murderer
 Alfred Molina as Dr. Malick, Rivers' psychiatrist 
 Holmes Osborne as Judge Taylor
 Frederick Coffin as Detective Varole
 Carmen Argenziano as Defense Lawyer and Attorney
 Matt Letscher as Assistant District Attorney
 Marshall Bell as District Attorney
 Stuart M. Besser as Frozen Body Larry

Production

All filming was undertaken in the United States. Some took place in Lancaster, California and other places in Los Angeles County, while the majority was shot on a sound stage at Sony Pictures Studios in Culver City.

Angelo Badalamenti was originally signed to score the film, but his music was replaced with a new score by Alan Silvestri (Silvestri had previously replaced Badalamenti on 1991's Shattered).

Reception

Critical response
Roger Ebert gave the film three stars out of four and wrote, "I've seen a lot of movies that are intriguing for the first two acts and then go on autopilot with a formula ending. Identity is a rarity, a movie that seems to be on autopilot for the first two acts and then reveals that it was not, with a third act that causes us to rethink everything that has gone before. Ingenious, how simple and yet how devious the solution is."

Mick LaSalle of SFGate reported, "At first, Identity seems like nothing more than a pleasing and blatant homage (i.e., rip-off) to the Agatha Christie-style thriller where marooned guests realize that a murderer is in their midst... we've seen it before. Yet make no mistake. Identity is more than an entertaining thriller. It's a highly original one."

The Village Voice's Dennis Lim wrote of the film's premise, "The premise of the one-rainy-night thriller Identity seems like mothballed Agatha Christie," and of the film's third act twist, "The ultimate cliché of plot-twist implausibility, the crucial revelation is so outlandishly fatuous it might have given Donald Kaufman pause. But there's nothing self-parodic about Identity—the viewer must not only swallow the nullifying third-act bombshell but actually re-engage with the movie on its new, extremely dubious terms."

Brian Mckay of eFilmCritic.com wrote, "This film's cardinal sin was not that it had an engrossing but extremely far-fetched setup to a lackluster resolution—a resolution that probably sounded good during the initial script pitch, but which nobody realized was going to be such a misfire until the production was already at the point of no return. No, what Identity is guilty of most is bad timing—it simply gives away too much, too soon. At about the halfway mark (if not much sooner), the film's big "twist" will finally dawn on you (and if it doesn't, they'll end up coming right out and saying it five minutes later anyway). And once it does, you will no longer care what happens afterward."

On review aggregator website Rotten Tomatoes, the film has an approval rating of 62% based on 173 reviews, with an average rating of 6.40/10. The site's consensus states: "Identity is a film that will divide audiences—the twists of its plot will either impress or exasperate you." On Metacritic, the film has a weighted average score of 64 out of 100 based on 34 reviews, indicating "generally favorable reviews". Audiences polled by CinemaScore gave the film an average grade of "B" on an A+ to F scale.

Box office performance
Identity opened on April 25, 2003 in the United States and Canada in 2,733 theaters. The film ranked at #1 on its opening weekend, accumulating $16,225,263, with a per theater average of $5,936. The film's five-day gross was $18,677,884.

The film dropped down to #3 on its second weekend, behind newly released X2 and The Lizzie McGuire Movie, accumulating $9,423,662 in a 41.9% drop from its first weekend, and per theater average of $3,448. By its third weekend it dropped down to #4 and made $6,477,585, $2,474 per theater average.

Identity went on to gross $52.1 million in the United States and Canada and $38.1 million overseas. In total, the film has grossed over $90 million worldwide, making it a box office success against its $28 million budget.

Accolades
The film was nominated for Best Action, Adventure or Thriller Film and Best DVD Special Edition Release at 30th Saturn Awards, but lost to Kill Bill Volume 1 and The Lord of the Rings: The Two Towers, respectively.

References

Further reading

External links
 
 
 
 

2003 films
2003 horror films
2000s mystery films
2003 psychological thriller films
American mystery thriller films
American nonlinear narrative films
American psychological horror films
American psychological thriller films
Films about dissociative identity disorder
2000s English-language films
Fiction with unreliable narrators
Films based on And Then There Were None
Films directed by James Mangold
Films produced by Cathy Konrad
Films scored by Alan Silvestri
Films set in hotels
Films set in Nevada
Films shot in California
Films shot in Los Angeles
Columbia Pictures films
2000s American films